The Executive Council of the Falkland Islands is the  policy making body of the Government of the Falkland Islands, exercising executive power by advising the Governor. It has an equivalent role to that of the Privy Council in the United Kingdom. The first Executive Council for the Falklands was inaugurated on 2 April 1845 by Governor Richard Moody.

Powers
The powers, function, membership and tenure of the Executive Council is prescribed in Chapter V of the Falkland Islands Constitution, which came into force on 1 January 2009. The executive authority of the Falkland Islands is vested in the King, and that authority is exercised on his behalf by the Governor of the Falkland Islands, who acts on the advice of the Executive Council. The constitution gives the governor the power to act against the advice of the Executive Council, however, governors are required to immediately report the matter to His Majesty's Government in the United Kingdom with an explanation.

The Executive Council can set up a Committee to which it can delegate any of its powers, such as the selecting of a Chief Executive, although any decision made by the Committee has to be approved by the Executive Council. Meetings of the Executive Council take place at the discretion of the Governor, although the Governor is obliged to hold a meeting if two or more Councillors request one. Council meetings normally take place monthly.

Membership
At the first meeting of the Legislative Assembly of the Falkland Islands after every general election, the Legislative Assembly elects three of its members to the Executive Council, of whom at least one must represent a Stanley constituency and at least one must represent a Camp constituency. The term of office for an Executive Council member is twelve months, after which time the Legislative Assembly elects new members to the Council, although Councillors are permitted to seek re-election to the Council as often as they like. Membership of the Council can end early if a Councillor resigns, or if an elected member ceases to also be a member of the Legislative Assembly. An elected Councillor member can be forcibly removed from the Council by a resolution in the Legislative Assembly. Also, membership is revoked automatically if a Councillor is absent for three consecutive Council meetings without permission.

There are also two ex officio members of the Council, the Chief Executive and the Director of Finance of the Falkland Islands, although they are barred from voting in the Council's meetings. The Commander of the British Forces in the South Atlantic Islands and the Attorney General of the Falkland Islands are also permitted to attend Council meetings, although they are not members of the Council and cannot vote. The Governor is also present at meetings of the Executive Council, acting as chairperson.

Elected members of the Executive Council during the current 2013 to 2017 Legislative Session
November 2013 to November 2014: Mike Summers (Stanley), Phyllis Rendell (Camp), Dr. Barry Elsby (Stanley)

November 2014 to November 2015: Mike Summers (Stanley), Phyllis Rendell (Camp), Michael Poole (Stanley)

November 2015 to November 2016: Mike Summers (Stanley), Phyllis Rendell (Camp), Jan Cheek (Stanley)

November 2016 to November 2017: Mike Summers (Stanley), Roger Edwards (Camp), Jan Cheek (Stanley)

Oath or affirmation
Under section 64 of the constitution, before taking part in any proceedings of the Executive Council, Councillors must take the oath or affirmation of secrecy. The wording is specified in Annex B to the Constitution:

References

  
 
 

1845 establishments in South America
Politics of the Falkland Islands
Privy councils